St. Charles is an unincorporated community and census-designated place (CDP) in Lee County, South Carolina, United States. It was first listed as a CDP prior to the 2020 census with a population of 114.

The CDP is in southern Lee County, at the junction of U.S. Route 401 and South Carolina Highway 154. Highway 401 leads northeast  to Darlington and southwest  to Sumter, while Highway 154 leads north  to Bishopville and south  to Mayesville.

Demographics

2020 census

Note: the US Census treats Hispanic/Latino as an ethnic category. This table excludes Latinos from the racial categories and assigns them to a separate category. Hispanics/Latinos can be of any race.

References 

Census-designated places in Lee County, South Carolina
Census-designated places in South Carolina